Quarnford is a civil parish in the district of Staffordshire Moorlands, Staffordshire, England. It contains eight listed buildings that are recorded in the National Heritage List for England. All the listed buildings are designated at Grade II, the lowest of the three grades, which is applied to "buildings of national importance and special interest".  Apart from the village of Flash, the parish is rural.  The listed buildings consist of a church with memorials in the churchyard, a former chapel, a farmhouse, and a former shepherd's hut.


Buildings

References

Citations

Sources

Lists of listed buildings in Staffordshire